Münchenbernsdorf is a Verwaltungsgemeinschaft ("administrative municipality community") in the district of Greiz, in Thuringia, Germany. The seat of the Verwaltungsgemeinschaft is in the town of Münchenbernsdorf.

Subdivision
The Verwaltungsgemeinschaft Münchenbernsdorf consists of the following municipalities with their populations ( as of June 20, 2006) in parentheses:

Bocka (545)
Hundhaupten (389)
Lederhose (295)
Lindenkreuz (504)
Münchenbernsdorf (3,304)
Saara (661)
Schwarzbach (250)
Zedlitz (711)

The town of Münchenbernsdorf itself is a member as well as the seat of this administrative municipality community since March 9, 1992.  The area of this community is 69.61 square kilometers and has a total population of 6,659 (June 20, 2006).

References

Verwaltungsgemeinschaften in Thuringia